Tony Roberts may refer to:
Tony Roberts (actor) (born 1939), American actor 
Tony Roberts (author), British author of the Casca series since 2006 
Tony Roberts (footballer) (born 1969), Welsh football player
Tony Roberts (racing driver) (1938–2001), winner of the 1969 Bathurst 500
Tony Roberts (sportscaster) (born 1928/29), American sports announcer
Tony T. Roberts, American stand-up comedian and actor
Tony Roberts (poet) (born 1949), British poet

See also
Anthony Roberts (disambiguation)